Barnes Street is located on the River Medway to the east of Tonbridge in Kent, England. It is part of the hamlet of Golden Green and in the civil parish of Hadlow. 

Hadlow